The Bălțătești mine is a large salt mine located in northern Romania in Neamț County, close to Bălțătești. Bălțătești represents one of the largest salt reserves in Romania having estimated reserves of 200 million tonnes of NaCl.

References 

Salt mines in Romania